Wewahitchka is a city in Gulf County, Florida, United States. The population was 2,074 as of the 2020 census. This was up from 1,722 as of the 2000 census. From the creation of Gulf County in 1925 until 1965, it served as the county seat before the county seat was moved to Port St. Joe. The city took its name from an American Indian word meaning "water eyes". Two lakes along the edge of town look like a perfect pair of eyes.

Geography
Wewahitchka is located in northeastern Gulf County at the junction of Florida State Roads 71 and 22. SR 71 leads north  to Blountstown and south  to Port St. Joe, while SR 22 leads west  to Panama City. It is located west of the Chipola River, a tributary of the Apalachicola River, and southwest of Dead Lake.

Demographics

As of the census of 2000, there were 1,722 people, 696 households, and 483 families residing in the city. The racial makeup of the city was 89.61% White, 7.55% African American, 7.64% Native American, 0.75% Asian, 0.17% Pacific Islander, and 1.28% from two or more races. Hispanic or Latino of any race were 1.05% of the population.

There were 696 households, out of which 29.2% had children under the age of 18 living with them, 49.4% were married couples living together, 15.4% had a female householder with no husband present, and 30.6% were non-families. 28.6% of all households were made up of individuals, and 13.9% had someone living alone who was 65 years of age or older.  The average household size was 2.47 and the average family size was 3.01.

In the city, the population was spread out, with 26.8% under the age of 18, 7.4% from 18 to 24, 24.0% from 25 to 44, 25.0% from 45 to 64, and 16.8% who were 65 years of age or older.  The median age was 39 years. For every 100 females, there were 90.7 males.  For every 100 females age 18 and over, there were 85.7 males.

The median income for a household in the city was $25,755, and the median income for a family was $32,935. Males had a median income of $26,023 versus $19,886 for females. The per capita income for the city was $13,731.  About 16.6% of families and 19.2% of the population were below the poverty line, including 24.3% of those under age 18 and 17.6% of those age 65 or over.

Schools
Wewahitchka is home to two schools of Gulf District Schools: Wewahitchka Elementary School and Wewahitchka High School, whose mascots are the Gators. There is a Head Start program at the old elementary site.

Tupelo honey
Wewahitchka is the site of one of Florida's largest beekeeping operations, which was the setting for Ulee's Gold, a movie filmed in the area. This honey is produced by placing beehives, known by the beekeepers as "Bee Boxes", in the swamps along the Apalachicola and other area rivers. In some areas the bees are placed on platforms and rafts to keep them above potential floods. Prior to the tupelo bloom, all earlier season honeys are stripped from the bees to avoid contamination with lesser grades produced earlier. Likewise, as soon as bloom is finished, the honey must be removed quickly before the bees have a chance to add other types of nectar.
Wewahitchka has a two-day Tupelo Honey festival each May.

Climate

According to the Köppen climate classification, Wewahitchka has a humid subtropical climate (Cfa).

References

External links
City of Wewahitchka official website

Cities in Gulf County, Florida
Cities in Florida
Former county seats in Florida